Rye College, formerly known as Thomas Peacocke Community College, is a coeducational secondary school with academy status, located in Rye, East Sussex, England.

History

The school developed from earlier schools in Rye such as Rye Grammar School which was founded by Sir Thomas Peacocke in 1636. It became a comprehensive school in (or before) 1969.

Ofsted judgement and academic performance

The school was judged Good by Ofsted in 2013. Performance at GCSE in 2017 was average compared to national results, based on the Progress 8 measure.

Future plans

As of December 2017, the plan is for Rye Studio School to merge with Rye College in September 2018.

Notable former pupils

Of Thomas Peacocke Community College:

 Simon Nelson, 10th Earl Nelson
 Mark Edwards, best-selling fiction writer
 James McCartney, musician and songwriter
 Mary McCartney, photographer and vegetarian cookery writer
 Stella McCartney, fashion designer

Of Rye Grammar School:

 Prof Percival Allen, Professor of Geology from 1952-82 at the University of Reading, and President from 1978-80 of the Geological Society of London
 Prof Ted Paige, expert on surface acoustic waves at the Royal Radar Establishment from 1955–77, and Professor of Electrical Engineering from 1977-97 at the University of Oxford. His research had great use for airborne radar used by the RAF from the 1970s.
 Harry Peulevé DSO MC
 Mark Saville, Baron Saville of Newdigate, chaired the Bloody Sunday Inquiry

References

Secondary schools in East Sussex
Academies in East Sussex
College